Kevin Thomas Rose  (born 4 June 1939) is a former Australian rules footballer who played for Collingwood in the VFL. He was one of four brothers who played for Collingwood with the most famous being his older brother Bob Rose.

Rose started his career as a half back flanker before becoming a ruck-rover. He was a Collingwood premiership player in 1958 and played in three losing grand final teams. He subsequently played for six years with Prahran on the Victorian Football Association. In 2003 he was selected in Prahran's Team of the Century.

After retiring as a player he took up coaching and was appointed senior coach of Fitzroy in 1975.

From 1996 to 1998 he was president of the Collingwood Football Club before being replaced by Eddie McGuire.

In 2015 Kevin Rose was awarded a Medal of the Order of Australia for "service to the community, and to Australian Rules football."

References

External links

Kevin Rose's coaching statistics from AFL Tables

1939 births
Living people
Australian rules footballers from Victoria (Australia)
Collingwood Football Club players
Collingwood Football Club Premiership players
Prahran Football Club players
Fitzroy Football Club coaches
Prahran Football Club coaches
Collingwood Football Club administrators
One-time VFL/AFL Premiership players
Recipients of the Medal of the Order of Australia